Capella Aircraft Corporation was an American aircraft manufacturer based in Austin, Texas. Formed about 1988, the company specialized in the design and manufacture of light aircraft in the form of kits for amateur construction, including for the US FAR 103 Ultralight Vehicles rules. The company went out of business about 2007.

Capella produced a number of aircraft designs, all of a strut-braced, high wing configuration. The first series were all enclosed cockpit designs, starting with the Capella SS, a single seat model introduced in 1988. In 1990 the Capella XS two-seat conventional landing gear model followed, along with a tricycle gear model, the Capella XLS. The Capella Fastback was introduced in 1995.

In 1998 the open cockpit single-seat Capella Javelin I was introduced as a FAR 103 ultralight. This was followed by the Capella Javelin II the same year and finally the Capella T-Raptor, all variants of the basic Javelin design.

Aircraft

References

Defunct aircraft manufacturers of the United States
Ultralight aircraft
Homebuilt aircraft